Mersenne primes and perfect numbers are two deeply interlinked types of natural numbers in number theory. The numbers  corresponding to Mersenne primes must themselves be prime, although not all primes  lead to Mersenne primes—for example, . Meanwhile, perfect numbers are natural numbers that equal the sum of their positive proper divisors, which are divisors excluding the number itself.

There is a one-to-one correspondence between the Mersenne primes and the even perfect numbers. This is due to the Euclid–Euler theorem, partially proved by Euclid and completed by Leonhard Euler: even numbers are perfect if and only if they can be expressed in the form , where  is a Mersenne prime. In other words, all numbers that fit that expression are perfect, while all even perfect numbers fit that form.

It is currently an open problem as to whether there are an infinite number of Mersenne primes and even perfect numbers.

The following is a list of all currently known Mersenne primes and perfect numbers, along with their corresponding exponents . , there are 51 known Mersenne primes (and therefore perfect numbers), the largest 17 of which have been discovered by the distributed computing project Great Internet Mersenne Prime Search, or GIMPS. New Mersenne primes are found using the Lucas-Lehmer test (LLT), a primality test for Mersenne primes that is efficient for binary computers. 

The displayed ranks are among indices currently known ; while unlikely, ranks may change if smaller ones are discovered. According to GIMPS, all possibilities less than the 48th working exponent  have been checked and verified . The discovery year and discoverer are of the Mersenne prime, since the perfect number immediately follows by the Euclid–Euler theorem. Discoverers denoted as "GIMPS / name" refer to GIMPS discoveries with hardware used by that person. Later entries are extremely long, so only the first and last 6 digits of each number are shown.

Historically, the largest known prime number has often been a Mersenne prime.

Notes

References

External links
 
 
 
 List on GIMPS, with the full values of large numbers
 A technical report on the history of Mersenne numbers, by Guy Haworth

Mathematical tables
Mathematics-related lists
 List
 List